Alexandru IV Iliaș was Prince of Wallachia from 1616 to 1618,  then from 1628 to 1629, and Prince of Moldavia from 1620 to 1621 and 1631 to 1633.

Life 
Alexandru IV Iliaș was the son of Ilie, or Iliaș, himself son of Alexandru IV Lăpușneanu, Prince of Moldavia. His father was elected Prince of Wallachia in March 1591 but he could not win against Radu.

Alexandru IV was approved Prince of Wallachia by the Ottomans from September 1616 to November 1618 and from October 1629 to September 10, 1630. He was also Prince of Moldavia under the name Alexandru Ilie from September 10, 1620 (after the Battle of Țuțora) to October 1621 and from December 1631 to April 1633; he died the same year (or 1666).

From an unknown wife he left two sons:
 Radu XI Iliaș, Prince of Wallachia;
 Iliaș Alexandru, Prince of Moldavia.

Sources 
 Alexandru Dimitrie Xenopol Histoire des Roumains de la Dacie trajane: Depuis les origines jusqu'à l'union des principautés. E. Leroux Paris (1896)
 Nicolas Iorga Histoire des Roumains et de la romanité orientale. (1920)
  Constantin C. Giurescu & Dinu C. Giurescu, Istoria Românilor Volume III (from 1606), Editura Științifică și Enciclopedică, București, 1977.
 Jean Nouzille La Moldavie, Histoire tragique d'une région européenne, Ed. Bieler, .
 Gilles Veinstein, Les Ottomans et la mort   (1996)  .
 Joëlle Dalegre Grecs et Ottomans 1453-1923. De la chute de Constantinople à la fin de l'Empire Ottoman, L'Harmattan Paris (2002)  .

Rulers of Wallachia
Rulers of Moldavia
1666 deaths